The 2017 season is Ratchaburi Mitr Phol's 5th season in the Thai League T1  since 2013.

Thai League

Thai FA Cup

Thai League Cup

Reserve team in Thai League 4

Ratchaburi Mitr Phol send the reserve team to compete in T4 Western Region as Ratchaburi Mitr Phol B.

Squad goals statistics

Transfers
First Thai footballer's market is opening on December 14, 2016 to January 28, 2017
Second Thai footballer's market is opening on June 3, 2017 to June 30, 2017

In

Out

Loan in

Loan out

References

Ratchaburi Mitr Phol F.C. seasons
Association football in Thailand lists
RBM